Marj, is a village located in the Western Beqaa District of the Beqaa Governorate in Lebanon.

History
In 1838, Eli Smith noted  it as el-Merj; a Sunni Muslim, Maronite and Catholic village in the Beqaa Valley.

References

Bibliography

External links
Marj (Beqaa Ouest), localiban

Populated places in Western Beqaa District
Sunni Muslim communities in Lebanon
Maronite Christian communities in Lebanon